is a Japanese racing driver currently competing in the Super GT series in GT300 class with , one of the teams under Toyota Motorsport's GAZOO racing arm. Iida won the 2002 All Japan Grand Touring Car Championship GT500 class with Esso Toyota Team LeMans, driving with Juichi Wakisaka. He also won 2013 Asian Le Mans Series GTE class driving for Team Taisan Ken Endless.

Iida was also a presenter on the Japanese Best Motoring TV series.

Career
Iida has competed in Super GT since 1994; he has five career wins and also won the driver's title in 2002.

Iida have also driven in Formula 3000 and Formula Nippon.

Being experienced at the 24 Hours of Le Mans, Akira Iida did also participate in the 2008 24 Hours Nürburgring race as well as in VLN endurance races, winning his class twice with a Lexus LF-A.

On August 31, 2011, Iida recorded a lap time of 7:14.64 in a fully road-legal Lexus LFA Nürburgring Package around the Nürburgring Nordschleife. This marked a new fastest time for regular production cars, running on standard specification tyres.

Racing record

24 Hours of Le Mans

Complete JTC/JTCC results

Japanese Top Formula Championship results

International Formula 3000 results

Complete JGTC/Super GT Results 
(key) (Races in bold indicate pole position) (Races in italics indicate fastest lap)

External links
 Official site
 SuperGT.net profile
 Photo and CV 

Japanese racing drivers
Japanese Formula 3000 Championship drivers
Formula Nippon drivers
Super GT drivers
Japanese Touring Car Championship drivers
24 Hours of Le Mans drivers
1969 births
Living people
People from Sagamihara
International Formula 3000 drivers
Blancpain Endurance Series drivers
Asian Le Mans Series drivers
Toyota Gazoo Racing drivers
Nismo drivers
Team LeMans drivers
Nürburgring 24 Hours drivers
Team Kunimitsu drivers
Nordic Racing drivers